Bird control or bird abatement involves the methods to eliminate or deter pest birds from landing, roosting and nesting.

Bird control is important because pest birds can create health-related problems through their feces, including histoplasmosis, cryptococcosis, and psittacosis. Bird droppings may also cause damage to property and equipment. Birds also frequently steal from crops and fruit orchards.

Methods of bird control include physical deterrents, visual deterrents, multi-sensory deterrents, sonic devices, trained birds of prey (falconry), chemicals, contraceptives and active barriers, among others. Birds usually adapt quickly to most static bird control devices because the birds adapt after exposure to false threats. The avian control devices that are most effective either physically "block" the birds or "actively modify behavior" using a mild harmless shock.

Bird control is frequently used for birds considered pests, such as feral pigeons, common starlings, house sparrows, crows and gulls, depending on the area.

Methods
Bird control devices fall under two categories: deterrents and exclusions. Deterrent devices, such as sonic units and bird spikes, discourage birds from landing or roosting in an area by presenting a physical obstacle or causing discomfort and annoyance for the target bird. Exclusion devices are 100% effective when installed correctly, as they entirely prevent birds from physically entering the treated area. There are far fewer exclusion devices, which include bird netting, mesh, and structural modifications, than deterrent options.

Physical
Physical bird deterrents include steel or plastic spike systems, bird netting, electrified wire systems, non-electrified wire systems, electrified track systems, slope barriers, mechanical spiders, chemical foggers and more. While "blocking" and "shocking" methods do not harm birds, sharp bird spikes can pierce and impale birds, although this is not their intended use. The safer shocking and blocking methods simply repel birds from an area with no harm. Spikes can also be counterproductive, as smaller species like sparrows can use the spikes as a structure to build their nests inside. The Humane Society of the United States (HSUS) recommends the use of bird netting, bird wire, contraceptives and low-current electric barriers. Many different bird control products are used widely throughout the U.S. and the world, with low-current shock wire and strips, netting, and mesh being the most effective bird control methods.

Chemical
Chemical deterrents range from products for turf to avicides. There are taste aversion products for geese, and fogging agents used for birds. Many localities have restrictions on the use of chemicals and pesticides targeted at birds if they intend to kill them. Non-avicide chemical deterrents that do not harm birds are widely used, but with limited results.

Acoustics
Sonic avian deterrents are used widely in large open areas. Sounds include predator cries and distress calls of a variety of birds to discourage pest birds from coming into an area. Common locations for these devices include vineyards, reclamation plants, airports, and other open areas. There are also ultrasonic avian deterrents, which are inaudible to human ears.

In 2013, Dr. John Swaddle and Dr. Mark Hinders at the College of William and Mary created a new method of deterring birds and other animals using benign sounds projected by conventional and directional (parametric) speakers. The initial objectives of the technology were to displace problematic birds from airfields to reduce bird strike risks, minimize agricultural losses due to pest bird foraging, displace nuisance birds that cause extensive repair and chronic clean-up costs, and reduce bird mortality from flying into man-made structures. The sounds, referred to as a "Sonic Net", do not have to be loud and are a combination of wave forms – collectively called "colored" noise – forming non-constructive and constructive interference with how birds and other animals such as deer talk to each other.

Wind-based
Wind-driven scare devices include tapes, balloons, kites, and lightweight spinning turbines propelled by wind. These devices reflect sunlight and in limited uses scare birds that are new to an area. Birds may become acclimated to such devices once they discover that they present no real threat to their safety.

Raptors
According to the US Fish and Wildlife Service, a falconer may request any Migratory Bird Treaty Act of 1918 (MBTA)-protected raptor species that may be used for falconry except for golden eagles. The use of bald eagles or golden eagles for abatement is prohibited by the Bald and Golden Eagle Protection Act. All raptors used for abatement must be captive bred and banded with a seamless metal band issued by the Service.

The MBTA list can be found here.

Species include 
Aplomado Falcon (Falco Femoralis)
Peregrine Falcon (Falco Peregrinus)
Gyr/Peregrine Hybrids
Barbary Falcon (Falco Pelegrinoides)
Harris Hawk (Parabuteo Unicinctus)
Prairie Falcon (Falco Mexicanus)

Effectiveness
Over the course of weeks or months, birds may adapt to bird control deterrent devices that do not present an actual threat to their survival. Such bird control devices include sound devices, mechanical devices, wind-blown scare devices, and partial perch modifications. In contrast, birds cannot adapt to total "blocking" methods or mild electrical low current "shocking" stimuli that modify behavior. This is why netting, mesh, and low-current electrical barriers are the most effective avian control devices. High-quality materials and long-lasting systems have the greatest return on investment because bird problems are perpetual year after year. 

For sonic units, long-term effectiveness increases with sophisticated digital sound reproduction played in random sequences and intervals. Other static sound methods with limited effectiveness that birds may adapt quickly to include ultrasonic devices designed for enclosed or semi-enclosed areas. In theory, ultrasonic waves will annoy birds to stop them from entering and remaining in areas such as warehouses, parking garages, and loading docks. These products are not harmful to birds, yet their effectiveness is debatable, as bird are believed to have similar hearing abilities as humans. Thus, studies have shown effectiveness is very low within months of initial contact when using ultrasonic sound generators to prevent birds from inhabiting an area. If just placed in situ and left, audible bird scarers can easily become ineffective. However, when managed on an ongoing basis or used as part of a greater bird deterrent system, sound methods can deliver partial results for low-level bird activity. Audible bird scarers are ineffective once birds have already nested.

The latest field testing of sonic colored noise shows the birds habituate after a few months even though the sounds are unnatural. This is because as one bird habituates other birds may learn the noise is meaningless and not a real threat. During nesting season sounds have proven almost totally ineffective to birds foraging for extra food no matter the sounds.

See also
 Bird control spike
 Bird netting
 Bird scarer
 Bird trapping
 Wildlife contraceptive

References

Bird pest control